Henri I de Saint-Nectaire, marquis de La Ferté-Nabert, (1573 - Paris, 4 January 1662), was a French general and diplomat.

Biography 
He was a son of the Marquis François de Saint-Nectaire, State Councilor and Knight of the Order of the Holy Spirit, and of Jeanne de Laval, mistress of King Henry III.

He joined the King's Army at a young age and by 1622, he was Maréchal de camp in the army of Louis, Count of Soissons at La Rochelle. Then he was Lieutenant general in the government of Champagne.

From 1634 until 1637, Saint-Nectaire was ambassador to England, then ruled by King Charles I of England, but still before the English Civil War.

He was subsequently Minister of State and was a Knight of the Order of the Holy Spirit.

Marriage and children 
He married first Marguerite de La Châtre, daughter of Claude de La Châtre de La Maisonfort, and had
Henri II de La Ferté-Senneterre (1599–1681), Marshal of France
Charles de Saint Nectaire (1601–1667), married Marie D'Hautefort
Gabriel de Saint Nectaire
Marie de Saint Nectaire, married François de Belvezeix

Then he married in second marriage Anne de Sully-Rosny, bastard daughter of Maximilian II of Béthune.

Sources 
Louis André, Claude Le Peletier, Michel Le Tellier et l'organisation de l'armée monarchique, 1980
Anselme de Sainte-Marie, Angel of Sainte-Rosalie, Histoire de la Maison Royale de France, et des grands officiers de la Couronne

State ministers of France
Ambassadors of France to England
1573 births
1662 deaths
Order of the Holy Spirit